The Giro di Padania was a multi-stage cycling race which forms part of the UCI Europe Tour. It was held at the beginning of September in Northern Italy, in the region known as the Po Valley or Padania.

The first edition, won by Ivan Basso, was held from 6 September until 10 September 2011. About 200 riders participated to the first Giro di Padania, with the national teams of Australia, Poland and Slovenia. This edition was heavily disrupted by activists protesting against the Lega Nord and the Berlusconi government austerity plans. Activists also claimed that the race was intended as political Propaganda for the Lega Nord political party. In the 2011 edition the leader's jersey was green (which is also the colour of Lega Nord), but the colour was changed to blue in 2012.

The race was cancelled in 2013 and has not been held since.

Winners

References

External links
 Official Website

UCI Europe Tour races
Cycle races in Italy
Recurring sporting events established in 2011
2011 establishments in Italy
Recurring sporting events disestablished in 2012
2012 disestablishments in Italy
Defunct cycling races in Italy